Calabasas may refer to:

  Calabasas, Arizona, former populated place in what is now Rio Rico, Arizona
  Calabasas, California, city in Los Angeles County, California

See also 
 Calabazas, or West Indian pumpkin